The 2000 Nokia New Zealand Film Awards were held on Saturday 1 July 2000 at the St James Theatre in Wellington, New Zealand. The awards were presented by the New Zealand Academy of Film and Television Arts and sponsored by Nokia New Zealand. This year saw the introduction of the $5000 Nokia New Zealand Film Awards Scholarship.

Nominees and Winners

Prizes were awarded in 19 categories with two special prizes - the Rudall Hayward Award (lifetime achievement) and the Nokia NZ Filmmaker's Scholarship. Student thriller Scarfies dominated the awards, winning six out of its 12 nominated categories.

Feature films 

Best Film
Scarfies, Lisa ChatfieldSavage Honeymoon, Steve Sachs
The Price of Milk, Fiona CoplandBest DirectorRobert Sarkies, Scarfies
Mark Beesley, Savage Honeymoon
Vanessa Alexander, Magik & Rose

Best Actor
Cliff Curtis, Jubilee
Karl Urban, The Price of Milk
Taika Cohen, Scarfies

Best Actress
Willa O'Neill, Scarfies
Danielle Cormack, The Price of Milk
Alison Bruce, Magik & Rose

Best Supporting Actor
Jon Brazier, Scarfies
Hori Ahipene, Jubilee
Scott Wills, Hopeless

Best Supporting Actress
Elizabeth Hawthorne, Savage Honeymoon
Sophia Hawthorne, Savage Honeymoon
Ashleigh Seagar, Scarfies

Best Juvenile Performer
Olivia Tennet, Kids World
Morgan Hubbard-Palmer, Wild Blue

Best Screenplay
Duncan Sarkies, Robert Sarkies, Scarfies
Mark Beesley, Savage Honeymoon
Michael Bennett, Jubilee
Vanessa Alexander, Magik & Rose

Best Cinematography
Leon Narbey, The Price of Milk
Leon Narbey, Jubilee
Stephen Downes, Scarfies

Best Editing
Annie Collins, Scarfies
Margot Francis, Savage Honeymoon
Cushla Dillon, The Price of Milk

Best Original Music
Dean Savage, Savage Honeymoon
Plan 9, Jubilee
Victoria Kelly, Magik & Rose

Best Contribution to a Soundtrack
John McKay, Jubilee
Chris Burt, Savage Honeymoon
Chris Burt, Scarfies

Best Design
Gary Mackay, Savage Honeymoon
Gaylene Barnes, Scarfies

Best Costume Design
Emily Carter, Savage Honeymoon
Amanda Neale, Scarfies

Best Makeup
Denise Kum, Savage Honeymoon
Deirdre Haworth, Wild Blue

Short films

Best Short Film
Infection (James Cunningham, Director)The Painted Lady (Belinda Schmid, Director)Best Performance in a Short FilmSara Wiseman, Letters About The Weather
Elizabeth Morris, The Painted Lady
Scott Wills, Ouch

Best Script, Short Film
Jesse Warn, Little Samurai
Reuben Pollock & Peter Salmon, Letters About The Weather

Best Craft Contribution to Short Film
James Cunningham, CGI Creation & Animation, Infection
Aaron Morton, Director of Photograph, Little Samurai
Eric de Beus & Neil Pardington Editors, Losing Sleep

Special Awards 

Rudall Hayward Award (Lifetime Achievement Award)
 Ian Mune

Nokia NZ Filmmaker's Scholarship
 Reina Webster

References

New Zealand film awards
Film awards
New Zealand
2000s in New Zealand cinema
July 2000 events in New Zealand